Nightbird is a compilation album by keyboardist and composer Yanni, released on the Unison label in 1997. It peaked at #5 on Billboard's "Top New Age Albums" chart in the same year.

Background
Nightbird is a collection of rare and never before released recordings by Yanni, sparkles with imagination, flair and is sure to put a pulse in the bloodstream of even the casual listener. Being a skeptic, one will find a soothing yet orchestral wonder within the framework of each of Yanni's recordings.

All songs except "Nightbird" have previously been released. Although the above is a quote from a review at AllMusic, the liner notes of the CD actually say the following: Nightbird: A Collection of Yanni favorites including "Chasing Shadows" and "Days of Summer".

"Chasing Shadows" is not included on the album. "Marching Season" is included at track 5 instead, and is listed as "Chasing Shadows" in the liner notes.

Track listing

References

External links
Official Website

Yanni albums
1997 compilation albums